Sprent is a rural locality and town in the local government area of Central Coast, in the North West region of Tasmania. The 2016 census determined a population of 138 for the state suburb of Sprent.

History
The locality was gazetted in 1965.

Geography
The Wilmot River forms the south-eastern boundary, and the East Gawler River forms much of the western boundary.

Road infrastructure
The B15 route (Castra Road) enters from the north-east and runs through to the south-west before exiting, where it then follows the western boundary for some distance. Route B16 (Kindred Road) starts at an intersection with B15 and runs east before exiting. Route C123 (Top Gawler Road) starts at an intersection with B15 and runs west and north before exiting.

References

Localities of Central Coast Council (Tasmania)
Towns in Tasmania